Dame Isobel Cripps, GBE (née Swithinbank; 25 January 1891 – 11 April 1979), also known as Isobel, the Honourable Lady Cripps, was a British overseas aid organiser and the wife of the Honourable Sir Stafford Cripps.

Born at Denham, Buckinghamshire, she was the youngest of three children of Commander Harold William Swithinbank FRSE DL (1858–1928) and Amy Eno, the daughter of James Crossley Eno. She was educated at the Heathfield School, near Ascot.

Swithinbank met Stafford Cripps in January 1910. The couple married on 12 July 1911 at Denham parish church and had four children: 
Sir John Stafford Cripps (1912–1993)
Isobel Diana Cripps (1913–1985)
(Anne) Theresa Cripps (1919–1998), who was married to Sir Robert Cornwallis Gerald St. Leger Ricketts, 7th Bt.
Peggy Cripps, born Enid Margaret Cripps (1921–2006), children's author and philanthropist, who married the Ghanaian lawyer and statesman Nana Joe Appiah; their son is the philosopher Kwame Anthony Appiah (b. 1954).

She was a governor of The Peckham Experiment in 1949 and a Vice President of the Electrical Association for Women.

References

Sources
 

1891 births
1979 deaths
Wives of knights
People from Denham, Buckinghamshire
English people of American descent
Dames Grand Cross of the Order of the British Empire
Winthrop family